Lamida is a genus of snout moths. It was described by Francis Walker in 1859.

Species
 Lamida buruensis
 Lamida mediobarbalis
 Lamida moncusalis Walker, [1859]
 Lamida obscura (Moore, 1888)

References

Epipaschiinae
Pyralidae genera